John Hughes McGeavy Hutcheson (31 March 1909 – 10 January 1979) was a Scottish footballer who played mainly as a left half.

He began his senior career at Falkirk where he made over 200 appearances in the Scottish Football League and Scottish Cup, and was selected for the Scottish Football League XI in March 1933, before moving on to English football with Chelsea in March 1934. He was more of a squad player than a first-team regular in his time at Stamford Bridge, but was still highly enough regarded to be selected for an unofficial international for charity between England and Scotland (the teams were selected from players based in and around London) to commemorate the silver jubilee of King George V.

He suffered a serious knee injury in 1936 which appeared to have ended his career and resulted in a compensatory payment from the Football League. However, by 1938 he was fit enough to sign for Ipswich Town, who used him in the reserves and FA Cup ties (as well as in coaching duties) but were declined permission by the league from using him in their matches due to his 'paid off' status, and the club decided not to dispute the matter further as they were newly elected members. In 1939 Hutcheson moved to non-league Crittall Athletic in Essex where the onset of World War II soon ended his career for good, however he settled in the local area.

References

Scottish footballers
Association football wing halves
1909 births
1979 deaths
Footballers from Falkirk (council area)
People from Larbert
Scottish Football League players
Scottish Football League representative players
Scottish Junior Football Association players
English Football League players
Preston Athletic F.C. players
Falkirk F.C. players
Chelsea F.C. players
Ipswich Town F.C. players
Braintree Town F.C. players
Ipswich Town F.C. non-playing staff
Association football coaches